The Solar Mesosphere Explorer (also known as Explorer 64) was a NASA spacecraft to investigate the processes that create and destroy ozone in Earth's upper of the atmosphere of Earth. The spacecraft carried five instruments to measure ozone, water vapor, and incoming solar radiation.

Mission 
Explorer 64 studied the processes that create and destroy ozone in the Earth's mesosphere. Over its 7.5 years mission, SME measured ultraviolet solar flux, ozone density, and the density of other molecules important to the understanding of ozone chemistry. During the mission over one hundred undergraduate and graduate students were involved in nearly every aspect of SME operations, including planning and scheduling spacecraft and science activities, controlling the spacecraft and its ground support system, and analyzing spacecraft subsystem performance.

Spacecraft 
Managed for NASA by the Jet Propulsion Laboratory, the Solar Mesosphere Explorer was built by Ball Space Systems and operated by the Laboratory for Atmospheric and Space Physics of the University of Colorado Boulder.

Characteristics:
 Mass: 437 kilograms
 Power: Solar panels and nickel-cadmium batteries
 Configuration: Cylinder 1.25 meter diameter by 1.7 meter high
 Science instruments: Ultraviolet ozone spectrometer, Micrometre spectrometer, Nitrogen dioxide spectrometer, Four-channel infrared radiometer, Solar ultraviolet monitor, Solar proton alarm detector

Launch 
Launched on 6 October 1981, on a Thor-Delta 2310 from Vandenberg Air Force Base, in California, the satellite returned data until 4 April 1989.

Atmospheric entry 
The spacecraft reentered Earth's atmosphere on 5 March 1991.

See also 

Explorer program

References

External links 
 JPL - Solar Mesosphere Explorer
 Launch video
 Nitric oxide measurements results
 Daily Solar Irradiance results

Earth observation satellites of the United States
NASA satellites
Explorers Program
Spacecraft launched in 1981
Spacecraft which reentered in 1991
Spacecraft launched by Delta rockets